Simon Thomas may refer to:

Simon Thomas (politician) (born 1963), Welsh politician, Plaid Cymru MP for Ceredigion 2000–05
Simon Thomas (presenter) (born 1973), English television presenter
Simon Thomas (footballer) (born 1984), English football player
Simon Thomas (soccer) (born 1990), Canadian football player

See also